The women's doubles tournament at the 1969 French Open was held from 26 May to 8 June 1969 on the outdoor clay courts at the Stade Roland Garros in Paris, France. The third-seeded team of Françoise Dürr and Ann Jones won the title, defeating the first-seeded pair of Margaret Court and Nancy Richey in the final in three sets.

Seeds

Draw

Finals

Top half

Section 1

Section 2

Bottom half

Section 3

Section 4

References

External links
 Main draw
1969 French Open – Women's draws and results at the International Tennis Federation

Women's Doubles
French Open by year – Women's doubles
1969 in women's tennis
1969 in French women's sport